Samaria is a historic and biblical name used for the central region of Palestine, bordered by Judea to the south and Galilee to the north. The first-century historian Josephus set the Mediterranean Sea as its limit to the west, and the Jordan River as its limit to the east. Its territory largely corresponds to the biblical allotments of the tribe of Ephraim and the western half of Manasseh. It includes most of the region of the ancient Kingdom of Israel, which was north of the Kingdom of Judah. The border between Samaria and Judea is set at the latitude of Ramallah.

The name "Samaria" is derived from the ancient city of Samaria, capital of the northern Kingdom of Israel. The name Samaria likely began being used for the entire kingdom not long after the town of Samaria had become Israel's capital, but it is first documented after its conquest by Sargon II of Assyria, who turned the kingdom into the province of Samerina.

Samaria was used to describe the northern midsection of the land in the UN Partition Plan for Palestine in 1947. It became the administrative term in 1967, when the West Bank was defined by Israeli officials as the Judea and Samaria Area, of which the entire area north of the Jerusalem District is termed as Samaria. In 1988, Jordan ceded its claim of the area to the Palestine Liberation Organization (PLO). In 1994, control of Areas 'A' (full civil and security control by the Palestinian Authority) and 'B' (Palestinian civil control and joint Israeli–Palestinian security control) were transferred by Israel to the Palestinian Authority. The Palestinian Authority and the international community do not recognize the term "Samaria"; in modern times, the territory is generally known as part of the West Bank.

Etymology
According to the Hebrew Bible, the Hebrew name "Shomron" is derived from the individual (or clan) Shemer, from whom King Omri (ruled 880s–870s BCE) purchased the hill on which he built his new capital city of Shomron (Samaria;).

The fact that the mountain was called Shomeron when Omri bought it may indicate that the correct etymology of the name is to be found more directly, in the Semitic root for "guard", hence its initial meaning would have been "watch mountain". In the earlier cuneiform inscriptions, Samaria is designated under the name of "Bet Ḥumri" ("the house of Omri"); but in those of Tiglath-Pileser III (ruled 745–727 BCE) and later it is called Samirin, after its Aramaic name, Shamerayin.

Historical boundaries

Northern kingdom to Hellenistic period
In Nelson's Encyclopaedia (1906-1934), the Samaria region in the three centuries following the fall of the northern kingdom of Israel, i.e. during the Assyrian, Babylonian, and Persian periods, is described as a "province" that "reached from the [Mediterranean] sea to the Jordan Valley".

Roman-period definition
The classical Roman-Jewish historian Josephus wrote: (4) Now as to the country of Samaria, it lies between Judea and Galilee; it begins at a village that is in the great plain called Ginea, and ends at the Acrabbene toparchy, and is entirely of the same nature with Judea; for both countries are made up of hills and valleys, and are moist enough for agriculture, and are very fruitful. They have abundance of trees, and are full of autumnal fruit, both that which grows wild, and that which is the effect of cultivation. They are not naturally watered by many rivers, but derive their chief moisture from rain-water, of which they have no want; and for those rivers which they have, all their waters are exceeding sweet: by reason also of the excellent grass they have, their cattle yield more milk than do those in other places; and, what is the greatest sign of excellency and of abundance, they each of them are very full of people. (5) In the limits of Samaria and Judea lies the village Anuath, which is also named Borceos. This is the northern boundary of Judea.

During the first century, the boundary between Samaria and Judea passed eastward of Antipatris, along the deep valley which had Beth Rima (today's Beit Rima) and Beth Laban (today's Al-Lubban al-Gharbi) on its southern, Judean bank; then it passed Anuath and Borceos, identified by Charles William Wilson (1836–1905) as the ruins of ’Aina and Khirbet Berkit; and reached the Jordan Valley north of Acrabbim and Sartaba. Mount Hazor also stands at that boundary.

Geography
To the north, the area known as the hills of Samaria is bounded by the Jezreel Valley; to the east, by the Jordan Rift Valley; to the northwest, by the Carmel Ridge; to the west, by the Sharon plain; and to the south, by the Jerusalem mountains.

The Samarian hills are not very high, seldom reaching the height of over 800 meters. Samaria's climate is more hospitable than the climate further south.

There is no clear division between the mountains of southern Samaria and northern Judea.

History

Over time, the region has been controlled by numerous different civilizations, including Canaanites, Israelites, Neo-Assyrians, Babylonians, Persians, Seleucids, Hasmoneans, Romans, Byzantines, Arabs, Crusaders, and Ottoman Turks.

Israelite tribes and kingdoms
According to the Hebrew Bible, the Israelites captured the region known as Samaria from the Canaanites and assigned it to the Tribe of Joseph. The southern part of Samaria was then known as Mount Ephraim. After the death of King Solomon (c. 931 BC), the northern tribes, including Ephraim and Menashe, separated from the southern tribes and established the separate Kingdom of Israel. Initially its capital was Tirzah until the time of King Omri (c. 884 BC), who built the city of Samaria and made it his capital. Samaria was the capital of Israel until its fall to the Assyrians. It was condemned by the Hebrew prophets for its "ivory houses" and luxury palaces displaying pagan riches.

Archaeologically, Samaria experienced significant settlement growth in Iron Age II. Archaeologists estimate that there were 400 sites, up from 300 during the Iron Age I. The people dwelt on tells, in small villages, farms, and forts, and in the cities of Shechem, Samaria and Tirzah in northern Samaria. Zertal estimated that about 52,000 people inhabited the Manasseh Hill in northern Samaria prior to the Assyrian deportations. According to botanists, the majority of Samaria's forests were torn down during the Iron Age II, and were replaced by plantations and agricultural fields. Since then, there have been few oak forests in the region.

Assyrian period 
In 726–722 BC, the new king of Assyria, Shalmaneser V, invaded the land and besieged the city of Samaria. After an assault of three years, the city fell and much of its population was taken into captivity and deported. Little documentation exists for the period between the fall of Samaria and the end of the Assyrian Empire. It seems likely that many returned in 715 BC due to slave revolts that Assyrian king Sargon was enduring. Tremper Longman III suggests that Ezra 4:2, Ezra 4:9-10 implies that later Assyrian kings also returned more Israelites to Samaria.

After the destruction of Israel, the Samaritans emerged as an ethnoreligious group in the region of Samaria, claiming descent from the Israelites. With their temple on Mount Gerizim, they continued to thrive for centuries.

According to the Jewish version of events, when the Judean exile ended in 539 BCE and the exiles began returning home from Babylon, Samaritans found their former homeland of the north populated by other people who claimed the land as their own and Jerusalem, their former glorious capital, in ruins. The inhabitants worshiped the Pagan gods, but when the then-sparsely populated areas became infested with dangerous wild beasts, they appealed to the king of Assyria for Israelite priests to instruct them on how to worship the "God of that country." The result was a syncretistic religion, in which national groups worshiped the Israelite God, but they also served their own gods in accordance with the customs of the nations from which they had been brought.

The Samaritans claimed that they were the true Israel who were descendants of the "Ten Lost Tribes" taken into Assyrian captivity. They had their own sacred precinct on Mount Gerizim and claimed that it was the original sanctuary. Moreover, they claimed that their version of the Pentateuch was the original and that the Jews had a falsified text produced by Ezra during the Babylonian exile. Today, most scholars believe the Samaritans were a blend of Israelites with other nationalities whom the Assyrians had resettled in the area.

Babylonian and Persian periods 

According to many scholars, archaeological excavations at Mount Gerizim indicate that a Samaritan temple was built there in the first half of the 5th century BCE. The date of the schism between Samaritans and Jews is unknown, but by the early 4th century BCE the communities seem to have had distinctive practices and communal separation. Much of the anti-Samaritan polemic in the Hebrew Bible and extra-biblical texts (such as Josephus) originate from this point and on.

Hellenistic and Roman periods
During the Hellenistic period, Samaria was largely divided between a Hellenizing faction based around the town of Samaria and a pious faction in Shechem and surrounding rural areas, led by the High Priest. Samaria was a largely autonomous state nominally dependent on the Seleucid Empire until around 113 BCE, when the Jewish Hasmonean ruler John Hyrcanus destroyed the Samaritan temple and devastated Samaria. Only a few stone remnants of the Samaritan temple exist today.

In 6 CE, Samaria became part of the Roman province of Iudaea, following the death of King Herod the Great.

Southern Samaria reached a peak in settlement during the early Roman period (63 BCE–70 CE), partly as a result of the Hasmonean dynasty's settlement efforts. The impact of the Jewish–Roman wars is archaeologically evident in Jewish-inhabited areas of southern Samaria, as many sites were destroyed and left abandoned for extended periods of time. After the First Jewish-Roman War, the Jewish population of the area decreased by around 50%, whereas after the Bar Kokhba revolt, it was completely wiped in many areas. According to Klein, the Roman authorities replaced the Jews with a population from the nearby provinces of Syria, Phoenicia, and Arabia. An apparent new wave of settlement growth in southern Samaria, most likely by non-Jews, can be traced back to the late Roman and Byzantine eras.

New Testament references
The New Testament mentions Samaria in Luke 17:11–2, in the miraculous healing of the ten lepers, which took place on the border of Samaria and Galilee. John 4:1-26 records Jesus' encounter at Jacob's Well with the woman of Sychar, in which he declares himself to be the Messiah. In Acts 8:1, it is recorded that the early community of disciples of Jesus began to be persecuted in Jerusalem and were 'scattered throughout the regions of Judea and Samaria'. Philip went down to the city of Samaria and preached and healed the sick there. In the time of Jesus, Iudaea of the Romans was divided into the toparchies of Judea, Samaria, Galilee and the Paralia. Samaria occupied the centre of Iudaea. (Iudaea was later renamed Syria Palaestina in 135, following the Bar Kokhba revolt.) In the Talmud, Samaria is called the "land of the Cuthim".

Byzantine period
Following the bloody suppression of the Samaritan Revolts (mostly in 525 CE and 555 CE) against the Byzantine Empire, which resulted in death, displacement, and conversion to Christianity, the Samaritan population dramatically decreased. In the central parts of Samaria, the vacuum left by departing Samaritans was filled by nomads who gradually became sedentarized.

The Byzantine period is considered the peak of settlement in Samaria, as in other regions of the country. Based on historical sources and archeological data, the Manasseh Hill surveyors concluded that Samaria's population during the Byzantine period was composed of Samaritans, Christians, and a minority of Jews. The Samaritan population was mainly concentrated in the valleys of Nablus and to the north as far as Jenin and Kfar Othenai; they did not settle south of the Nablus-Qalqiliya line. Christianity slowly made its way into Samaria, even after the Samaritan revolts. With the exception of Neapolis, Sebastia, and a small cluster of monasteries in central and northern Samaria, most of the population of the rural areas remained non-Christian. In southwestern Samaria, a significant concentration of churches and monasteries was discovered, with some of them built on top of citadels from the late Roman period. Magen raised the hypothesis that many of these were used by Christian pilgrims, and filled an empty space in the region whose Jewish population was wiped out in the Jewish–Roman wars.

Early Muslim, Crusader, Mamluk and Ottoman periods 
Following the Muslim conquest of the Levant, and throughout the early Islamic period, Samaria underwent a process of Islamization as a result of waves of conversion among the remaining Samaritan population, along with the migration of Muslims into the area. Evidence implies that a large number of Samaritans converted under Abbasid and Tulunid rule, as a result of droughts, earthquakes, religious persecution, high taxes, and anarchy. By the mid-Middle Ages, the Jewish writer and explorer Benjamin of Tudela estimated that only around 1,900 Samaritans remained in Palestine and Syria.

British Mandate
During the Great War, Palestine was wrestled by the armies of the British Empire from the Ottoman Empire and in the aftermath of the war it was entrusted to the United Kingdom to administer as a League of Nations mandated territory Samaria was the name of one of the administrative districts of Palestine for part of this period. The 1947 UN partition plan called for the Arab state to consist of several parts, the largest of which was described as "the hill country of Samaria and Judea."

Jordanian period
As a result of the 1948 Arab–Israeli War, most of the territory was unilaterally incorporated as Jordanian-controlled territory, and was administered as part of the West Bank (west of the Jordan river).

Israeli administration
The Jordanian-held West Bank was captured and has been occupied by Israel since the 1967 Six-Day War. Jordan ceded its claims in the West Bank (except for certain prerogatives in Jerusalem) to the PLO in November 1988, later confirmed by the Israel–Jordan Treaty of Peace of 1994. In the 1994 Oslo accords, the Palestinian Authority was established and given responsibility for the administration over some of the territory of West Bank (Areas 'A' and 'B').

Samaria is one of several standard statistical districts utilized by the Israel Central Bureau of Statistics. "The Israeli CBS also collects statistics on the rest of the West Bank and the Gaza District. It has produced various basic statistical series on the territories, dealing with population, employment, wages, external trade, national accounts, and various other topics." The Palestinian Authority however use Nablus, Jenin, Tulkarm, Qalqilya, Salfit, Ramallah and Tubas governorates as administrative centers for the same region.

The Shomron Regional Council is the local municipal government that administers the smaller Israeli towns (settlements) throughout the area. The council is a member of the network of regional municipalities spread throughout Israel. Elections for the head of the council are held every five years by Israel's ministry of interior, all residents over age 17 are eligible to vote. In special elections held in August 2015 Yossi Dagan was elected as head of the Shomron Regional Council.

Israeli settlements in the West Bank are considered by some in the international community to be illegal under international law, but others including the United States and Israeli governments dispute this. In September 2016, the Town Board of the American Town of Hempstead in the State of New York, led by Councilman Bruce Blakeman entered into a partnership agreement with the Shomron Regional Council, led by Yossi Dagan, as part of an anti-Boycott, Divestment and Sanctions campaign.

Archaeological sites

Ancient city of Samaria/Sebaste

The ancient site of Samaria-Sebaste covers the hillside overlooking the West Bank village of Sebastia on the eastern slope of the hill. Remains have been found from the Canaanite, Israelite, Hellenistic, Roman (including Herodian) and Byzantine periods.

Archaeological finds from Roman-era Sebaste, a site that was rebuilt and renamed by Herod the Great in 30 BC, include a colonnaded street, a temple-lined acropolis, and a lower city, where John the Baptist is believed to have been buried.

The Harvard excavation of Samaria, which began in 1908, was headed by Egyptologist George Andrew Reisner. The findings included Hebrew, Aramaic, cuneiform and Greek inscriptions, as well as pottery remains, coins, sculpture, figurines, scarabs and seals, faience, amulets, beads and glass. The joint British-American-Hebrew University excavation continued under John Winter Crowfoot in 1931–35, during which time some of the chronology issues were resolved. The round towers lining the acropolis were found to be Hellenistic, the street of columns was dated to the 3–4th century, and 70 inscribed potsherds were dated to the early 8th century.

In 1908–1935, remains of luxury furniture made of wood and ivory were discovered in Samaria, representing the Levant's most important collection of ivory carvings from the early first millennium BC. Despite theories of their Phoenician origin, some of the letters serving as fitter's marks are in Hebrew.

As of 1999 three series of coins have been found that confirm Sinuballat was a governor of Samaria. Sinuballat is best known as an adversary of Nehemiah from the Book of Nehemiah where he is said to have sided with Tobiah the Ammonite and Geshem the Arabian. All three coins feature a warship on the front, likely derived from earlier Sidonian coins. The reverse side depicts the Persian King in his kandys robe facing down a lion that is standing on its hind legs.

Other ancient sites
 The Bull Site, an Iron I cult site
 Tel Dothan near Jenin, identified with biblical Dothan
 Khirbet Kurkush, site of an ancient Samaritan or Jewish settlement with a notable necropolis
 Khirbet Samara, site of an ancient Samaritan synagogue
 Nablus area:
 Mount Gerizim, Samaritan and Byzantine ruins
 Mount Ebal site, Iron Age remains on Mount Ebal, seen by many scholars as an early Israelite cultic site
 Tell Balata, identified as biblical Shechem
 Khirbet Seilun/Tel Shiloh, identified with Shiloh (biblical city)
 Tell el-Far'ah (North), identified with biblical Tirzah, the third capital of the northern Kingdom of Israel.

Samaritans

Religiously, the Samaritans are adherents of Samaritanism, an Abrahamic religion closely related to Judaism. Based on the Samaritan Torah, Samaritans claim their worship is the true religion of the ancient Israelites prior to the Babylonian exile, preserved by those who remained behind. Their temple was built at Mount Gerizim in the middle of the 5th century BCE, and was destroyed under the Hasmonean king John Hyrcanus of Judea in 110 BCE, although their descendants still worship among its ruins. The antagonism between Samaritans and Jews is important in understanding the Bible's New Testament stories of the "Samaritan woman at the well" and "Parable of the Good Samaritan". The modern Samaritans, however, see themselves as co-equals in inheritance to the Israelite lineage through Torah, as do the Jews, and are not antagonistic to Jews in modern times.

See also
 Archevites
 Samaritan Revolts
 List of burial places of biblical figures
 Ahwat
 Judea and Samaria Area

References

Further reading 

 Tappy, R. E. (2006). "The Provenance of the Unpublished Ivories from Samaria", pp. 637–56 in "I Will Speak the Riddles of Ancient Times" (Ps 78:2b): Archaeological and Historical Studies in Honor of Amihai Mazar on the Occasion of His Sixtieth Birthday, A. M. Maeir and P. de Miroschedji, eds. Winona Lake, IN: Eisenbrauns.
 Tappy, R. E. (2007). "The Final Years of Israelite Samaria: Toward a Dialogue Between Texts and Archaeology", pp. 258–79 in Up to the Gates of Ekron: Essays on the Archaeology and History of the Eastern Mediterranean in Honor of Seymour Gitin, S. White Crawford, A. Ben-Tor, J. P. Dessel, W. G. Dever, A. Mazar, and J. Aviram, eds. Jerusalem: The W. F. Albright Institute of Archaeological Research and the Israel Exploration Society.

External links

 
 

 
Geography of the State of Palestine
Hebrew Bible regions
Historical regions in Israel
Land of Israel
Middle East
New Testament regions
Samaritan culture and history
Former kingdoms